Lien de parenté is a French TV drama film from 1986. It was directed by Willy Rameau and written by Didier Kaminka, starring Jean Marais and Serge Ubrette. The script was based on Oliver Lang's novel "Next of Kin".

Cast 
 Jean Marais: Victor Blaise
 Serge Ubrette: Clément, dit Clem
 Anouk Ferjac: Patricia Guérin
 : Philippe Guérin
 Diane Niederman: Cécile
 Charles Millot: Werner
 Michel Amphoux: Benavidez, the bistrot keeper
 Bernard Farcy: Lucien Donat

References

External links 
 
 
 

1980 television films
1980 films
French drama films
French television films
1980s French-language films
1980s French films